Fumiquinazolines are bio-active isolates of Aspergillus.

References

Further reading

External links
 New metabolites from the marine-derived fungus Aspergillus fumigatus
 pubchem.ncbi

Aspergillus compounds
Nitrogen heterocycles
Heterocyclic compounds with 3 rings
Lactams
Spiro compounds